James Dodd may refer to:
James William Dodd (1740–1796), English actor
James Jonas Dodd (1863–1925), English political activist
James Dodd (artist), Australian artist
James Munro Dodd (1915–1986), marine biologist
James Dodd (footballer), English footballer
Jimmie Dodd (James William Dodd, 1910–1964), American actor, singer and songwriter
Jimmy Dodd (footballer) (born 1933), English footballer

See also
James Dodds (disambiguation)
Jimmy Dodd (disambiguation)